Sokol is a surname of Slavic-language origin (meaning "falcon"). Notable people with the surname include:

Alejandro Sokol (1961–2009), Argentine musician
Alois Sokol (1914–1991), Czech fencer
Andy Sokol (born 1928), Canadian football player
Artyom Sokol (Russian footballer) (born 1997), Russian footballer
Artyom Anatolyevich Sokol (born 1994), Belarusian footballer
Daniel Sokol (born 1978), French barrister and medical ethicist
David L. Sokol (born 1956), American businessman
František Sokol (1939–2011), Czech volleyball player
Herman Sokol (1917–1985), American chemist
Jan Sokol (disambiguation), multiple people
Jason Sokol (born 1977), American historian
Koloman Sokol (1902–2003), Slovak-American artist
Kyle Sokol (born 1974), American bassist
Marilyn Sokol (born 1944), American actress
Matt Sokol (born 1995), American football player
Natalia Sokol (born 1980), Russian activist
Ondřej Sokol (born 1971), Czech director
Paweł Sokół (born 2000), Polish footballer
Pavel Sokol (born 1996), Czech footballer
Pavel Sokol (rower) (born 1969), Czech rower
Ronald Sokol (born 1939), American lawyer and writer
Sasha Sokol (born 1970), Mexican singer
Svyatoslav Sokol
Tomislav Sokol (born 1982), Croatian politician
Tony Sokol (born 1963), American playwright
Vanina García Sokol (born 1983), Argentine tennis player
Viktor Sokol (disambiguation), multiple people
Vilem Sokol (1915–2011), Czech-American conductor

See also
Sokol (given name), people with the given name "Sokol"
Sokolov (surname)
Sokolović, surname

Slavic-language surnames
Czech-language surnames
Croatian surnames
Jewish surnames